Escadrille Spa.86 was a French Air Force fighter squadron active from 6 April 1917 through the end of World War I. They served as a component of Groupe de Combat 14, and were Cited in orders on 28 October 1918 for having downed 30 German aircraft.

History
Escadrille Spa.86 was formed as Escadrille N86 because it was originally outfitted with Nieuport airplanes, although it had a few SPADs. Founded 6 April 1917 at Vélizy – Villacoublay Air Base, France, it was immediately incorporated into Groupe de Combat 14 (Combat Group 14, or GC14).

GC14 began its operations with VI Armee. On 10 May 1917, GC14 was transferred to II Armee on 29 June 1917. GC14 would be shifted three more times, late that year--to VI Armee on 11 October, to III Armee on 20 November, and to VI Armee eight days later.

By early 1918, the squadron had gone all SPAD and was redesignated as Escadrille Spa.86. It remained part of GC14. The groupe moved to III Armee on 24 March 1918 for a week, back to VI Armee, then attached to the Royal Air Force Third Brigade on 15 April. It spent May in Flanders. On 1 June 1918, GC14 was posted to X Armee. On 9 October 1918, GC 14 moved to 1er Armee. That was their last posting, as the Armistice of 11 November 1918 ended hostilities.

On 28 October 1918, Escadrille Spa.86 was cited in orders for having destroyed 30 German aircraft.

Commanding officers
 Capitaine Andre Brault: 6 April 1917
 Lieutenant Etienne Thieriz: 27 April 1917
 Lieutenant Antoine d'Aboville: 24 October 1918

Notable members
Colonel Henri Hay De Slade

Aircraft
 Nieuport fighters: 6 April 1917 until early 1918
 SPAD fighters: From 6 April 1917 on

End notes

Reference
 Franks, Norman; Bailey, Frank (1993). Over the Front: The Complete Record of the Fighter Aces and Units of the United States and French Air Services, 1914–1918 London, UK: Grub Street Publishing. .

Fighter squadrons of the French Air and Space Force
Military units and formations established in 1917
Military units and formations disestablished in 1918
Military units and formations of France in World War I
Military aviation units and formations in World War I